This is a summary of 1972 in music in the United Kingdom, including the official charts from that year.

Events
20 January – The premiere of Pink Floyd's The Dark Side of the Moon at The Dome, Brighton, is halted by technical difficulties. The Dark Side of the Moon would be played in its entirety the following night, but it would be a full year before the album was released.
21 January - Keith Richards jumps on stage to jam with Chuck Berry at the Hollywood Palladium, but is ordered off for playing too loud. Berry later claims that he did not recognize Keith and would not have booted him if he did.
9 February – Paul McCartney's new band, Wings, make their live debut at the University of Nottingham. It is McCartney's first public concert since The Beatles' 1966 US tour.
13 February – Led Zeppelin's concert in Singapore is cancelled when government officials will not let them off the airplane because of their long hair.
19 February - Paul McCartney's single "Give Ireland Back to the Irish" (which was inspired by the "Bloody Sunday" massacre in Ireland on 30 January 1972) is banned by the BBC 
25 March – The 17th Eurovision Song Contest is held in the Usher Hall, Edinburgh, Scotland. The only time (as of 2021) Scotland hosted the contest 
16 April – Electric Light Orchestra make their live debut at the Fox and Greyhound pub in Park Lane, Croydon, England.
2 May – Stone the Crows lead guitarist Les Harvey is electrocuted on stage during a show in Swansea, Wales, by touching a poorly connected microphone. Harvey died in a hospital a few hours later. The band's lead singer, Maggie Bell, Harvey's longtime girlfriend, was also hospitalized, having collapsed on stage after the incident.
1 June - premiere of Harrison Birtwistle's The Triumph of Time in London.
12 July - first performance of Peter Maxwell Davies's opera Taverner at the Royal Opera House.
 8 October - David Hughes is taken ill while singing the role of Pinkerton in Madam Butterfly in London. He completes the performance but dies shortly afterwards of heart failure.

Number Ones

Singles

Albums

Year-end charts

Best-selling singles

Best-selling albums
A list of the top twenty best-selling albums of 1972 was published in the issue of Record Mirror dated 13 January 1973, and a top fifty was later reproduced in the first edition of the BPI Year Book in 1976. However, in 2007 the Official Charts Company published album chart histories for each year from 1956 to 1977, researched by historian Sharon Mawer, and included an updated list of the top ten best-selling albums for each year based on the new research. The updated top ten for 1972 is shown in the table below.

Notes:

Classical works
Hugh Wood - Violin concerto no 1

Film and incidental music

Film
John Addison - Sleuth directed by Joseph L. Mankiewicz, starring Laurence Olivier and Michael Caine.
Ron Goodwin - Frenzy directed by Alfred Hitchcock.
David Munrow - Henry VIII and His Six Wives.
Eric Rogers - Carry On Matron.

Television
Herbert Chappell 
 Clouds of Witness
 The Shadow of the Tower

Musical Films
John Barry - Alice's Adventures in Wonderland.

Births
17 January – Aqualung, singer-songwriter
27 January – Mark Owen, singer (Take That)
29 February - Steve Hart, singer (Worlds Apart)
4 March – Alison Wheeler, singer (The Beautiful South)
20 March – Alex Kapranos, singer and guitarist (Franz Ferdinand)
27 April - Rob Coombes, keyboardist (Supergrass)
15 May – Conrad Keely, English-American singer-songwriter and guitarist (...And You Will Know Us by the Trail of Dead)
26 May - Alan White, drummer (Oasis)
14 June — Dominic Brown, English guitarist and songwriter 
17 June — Rikrok, British-Jamaican singer
6 July – Mark Gasser, English pianist and educator
11 July - Cormac Battle, English-Irish singer-songwriter, guitarist, and producer (Kerbdog and Wilt)
6 August – Geri Halliwell, singer (Spice Girls)
8 August - Bitty McLean, reggae singer
15 August - Mikey Graham, Irish singer (Boyzone)
6 September – Tony Dowding, singer (Bad Boys Inc)
20 September - Aaron Poole, singer (Worlds Apart)
21 September – Liam Gallagher, singer (Oasis)
23 November - Rick Witter, singer (Shed Seven)
3 December - Dan Bowyer, singer (Worlds Apart)
10 December - Brian Molko, singer (Placebo)
11 December – Easther Bennett, singer (Eternal)
13 December - Niki Evans, actress and singer

Deaths
20 February - Herbert Menges, conductor and composer, 69
21 March – David McCallum Sr., violinist and the father of David McCallum, 74
28 September - Rory Storm, singer, 33 (post-operative complications).
19 October - David Hughes, opera singer, 47 (heart failure)
28 November - Havergal Brian, composer, 96
date unknown
Jimmy MacBeath, folk singer, 77/78
Ivor McMahon, violinist, 47/48

See also 
 1972 in British radio
 1972 in British television
 1972 in the United Kingdom
 List of British films of 1972

References 

 
British
British music by year